Elections to the National Assembly of France were held in Algeria on 10 November 1946. The election was held with two colleges, citizens and non-citizens. Republican Rally and Algerian Unity won the most seats in the first college, whilst the Movement for the Triumph of Democratic Liberties won the most seats in the second college.

Results

First college

Second college

References

Elections in Algeria
1946-11
1946 in Algeria
1946 elections in Africa
1946 elections in France